Omkar Singh Markam is a politician from Madhya Pradesh. Omkar Singh Markam is third term MLA From Dindori Constituency of Madhya Pradesh. Indian National Congress appoints Omkar Singh Markam as a state president of Aadiwashi Congress. Omkar Singh Markam was the cabinet Minister for Tribal affairs Department, Denotifed Nomadic and Semi- Nomadic Tribes Welfare Department of Madhya Pradesh. He is a member of Indian National Congress.  He won the Legislative Assembly elections from Madhya Pradesh in 2008 and 2013. After winning the elections  he became the member of the assembly.
In 2014 he was announced as the candidate of Indian National Congress for the Lok Sabha elections from the Constituency Mandla. He is a General  Secretary  of Madhya  Pradesh Congress. 
Shri Omkar Singh Markam was born on May 2, 1976 at Barnai village in Dindori district. Son of Late Shri Nanku Singh Markam, Shri Markam has done his MA in Sociology. A farmer by profession, Shri Omkar Singh has interest in cultural programmes, social reform and poverty eradication programmes.

Political career 
Shri Markam has been the founder president of Netaji Subhash Chandra Bose Committee since the year 1996. Along with this, he has discharged the responsibility of office-bearer of Adivasi Vikas Parishad from year 1998 to year 2002. He was the General Secretary of District Youth Congress in the year 1998, President of Block Youth Congress, Samanpur in 2001, Secretary of Madhya Pradesh Youth Congress from 2003 to the year 2008 besides being district president of Rahul Gandhi Brigade, Dindori. He has led several public movements. Shri Markam was elected as member to the 13th Vidhan Sabha in year 2008. He was elected member second time in year 2013 and third time in year 2018.

References

External links

Living people
Indian National Congress politicians from Madhya Pradesh
Madhya Pradesh MLAs 2013–2018
People from Dindori
1976 births